Mau Heymans (born April 14, 1961, Veldhoven) is a Dutch Disney comics artist and writer. He started his career in 1987. He is primarily an illustrator and also wrote some stories with Kirsten de Graaf. Heyman does Scrooge McDuck universe comics for the publisher Oberon. His style is Barks-inspired, with long necks and beaks on the ducks. Mau Heyman's older brother, Bas Heymans, is also a Disney comics artist, and the brothers have styles very similar to each other.

Reprints
In 2018 Fantagraphics Books began publishing a hardcover series titled Disney Masters, in which Mau and his brother Bas Heymans in 2020 had a volume dedicated to their Disney works.
 Donald Duck: Scandal on the Epoch Express (2020) ISBN

References

External links
Mau Heymans at Inducks
Mau Heymans at the Lambiek Comiclopedia

1961 births
Living people
Dutch comics artists
Dutch comics writers
Disney comics writers
Disney comics artists
People from Veldhoven